The women's singles table tennis event at the 2011 Pan American Games will be held from October 18–21 at the CODE Dome in Guadalajara, Mexico.

Medals

Round robin
The round robin will be used as a qualification round. The forty participants will be split into groups of four. The top two players from each group will advance to the first round of playoffs. Groups will be announced at the technical meeting the day before the competition begins.

Group A

Group B

Group C

Group D

Group E

Group F

Group G

Group H

Group I

Group J

Playoffs

Finals

Top half

Bottom half

References

Table tennis at the 2011 Pan American Games
Pan